Aqa Alilu (also Romanized as Āqā ‘Alīlū; also known as Agal, Agally, Āghālī, and Aglu) is a village in Bedevostan-e Gharbi Rural District, Khvajeh District, Heris County, East Azerbaijan Province, Iran. At the 2006 census, its population was 186, in 35 families.

References 

Populated places in Heris County